The University of Northwestern Mindanao is a state university in the Philippines.  It is mandated to primarily offer higher professional, technical instructions for special purposes and promote research and extension services, advanced studies and progressive leadership in education, agriculture, fishery, engineering, arts and sciences, short-term vocational-technical and other continuing courses as may be relevant.

It shall also provide primary consideration to the integration of researches/ studies for the development of the Province of Misamis Occidental.  Its main campus is located in Labuyo, Tangub City, Misamis Occidental.

History
The Northwestern Mindanao State College of Science and Technology (NMSC) started as Tangub Agro-Industrial School (TANAIS) in Sumirap, Tangub City way back in 1971 offering secondary agriculture and trade curricula with Mr. Jesus T. Bonilla as principal. On June 26, 1973, the school was transferred to Labuyo, Tangub City three kilometers from the city proper and approximately four hundred meters from the national highway, with Dr. Perfecto B. Yebes as the Vocational School Administrator. The school started offering post secondary courses in 1974 and had been an affiliate off campus institute of the Central Mindanao University, Musuan, Bukidnon from 1979 to 1984. In 1994, Bachelor's Degree in Secondary Education and Industrial Technology were then offered. With the promotion of Dr. Yebes to a higher position, Mr. Apolonio S. Vidallo took place of the former and was appointed as the third administrator of TANAIS on August 6, 1996.

Prior to Dr. Yebes' promotion, in 1992 he and Atty. Philip T. Tan, the City Myor of Tangub at that time, conceived the idea of converting TANAIS into a state college. The proposal was filed in Congress by the late Hon. Hilarion Ramiro Jr., the Congressman of the 2nd District of Misamis Occidental at that time. The bill was not passed due to adjournment or the 9th Congress in 1995. The bill to convert TANAIS into a State College was refilled in the 10th Congress in 1995 by Congresswoman Herminia M. Ramiro. The bill passed both houses but with a last minute amendment to transfer the main campus from TANAIS in Tangub City to Oroquieta Agro-Industrial School (OAIS) at Oroquieta City.
Learning the amendment, Mayor Tan and Mr. Numeriano L. Gilbolingo and conferred with Congresswoman Herminia M. Ramiro to find the constitutional ground and had bill vetoed by President Fidel V. Ramos.

The bill was refiled in 1998 by the late Congressman Hilarion A. Ramiro Jr. It has already passed the lower house in 2000. By December 2000, Congressman Ramiro, Mayor Philip T. Tan, wife Jennifer Wee Tan and Mr. Numeriano L. Gilbolingo who represented Administrator Apolonio S. Vidallo successfully defended the conversion of Tangub Agro-Industrial School into Northwestern Mindanao State College of Science and Technology (NMSC) before the Senate Committee on Education chaired by the Honorable Sen. Teresita Aquino Oreta with the endorsement of Dr. Ester A. Garcia, Chairperson of the Commission on Higher Education.

Unfortunately, Congressman Ramiro died in January 2001. Congresswoman Herminia A. Ramiro was elected in May 2001, replacing the late Congressman Hilarion Ramiro Jr. With joint effort of Atty. Philip T. Tan and Congresswoman Herminia A. Ramiro, R.A. 9146 was finally approved by President Gloria Macapagal-Arroyo on July 30, 2001.

Dr. Zenaida G. Gersana was then designated by the Commission on Higher Education as the Officer-In-Charge and the Board of Trustees (BOT) was created to serve as its governing body.

On May 26, 2003, the Board of Trustees unanimously elected and appointed Atty. Philip T. Tan, CPA as the First President of NMSC after a two-month exhaustive selection process conducted by the Search Committee for Presidency (SCP). Dr. Glory S. Magdale, former Regional Director of the Commission on Higher Education, Region X, Cagayan de Oro City chaired the Search Committee for the Presidency.

During the Presidency of Atty. Tan, infrastructure projects flourished in the college. Among these are the twenty-classroom Academic Building, the Legarda Hall which is a laboratory building for students enrolled in Hospitality Management, Student Food Court and renovated Administration Offices. The projects significantly improved the physical facilities of the college.

The college occupies a total of 29 hectares campus site traversed by the barangay road leading to Panguil Bay, an area rich in marine resources with vast potentials suitable for home and industrial uses.

With the initiative of Atty. Philip Tan, the Php 5.4 Million pesos financial assistance from the Department of Science and Technology for the upgrading of the Science laboratory of the college was finally approved.

Upon the resignation of Atty. Philip T. Tan as College President in order to head the call to go back to public service as Mayor of Tangub City, Dr. Ricardo E. Rotoras, the visionary and dynamic President of Mindanao University of Science and Technology (MUST) was designated by the Board of Trustees as Officer In-Charge of the college in March 2010 by virtue of BOT Resolution No. 03,s. 2010.

With the active and participative leadership of Dr. Rotoras, the college hurdled its share of challenges and the second release of the DOST financial assistance was undertaken.

On September 6, 2012, Dr. Jennifer W. Tan was unanimously elected and appointed by the Board of Trustees as second President of the college by virtue of BOT Resolution No. 26,s. 2012.

Academic Programs Offered
NMSC's academic programs operate on a semester calendar beginning in early June and ending in late March.

Bachelor's degree programs
School of Engineering and Technology
Bachelor in Engineering Technology
 major in Mechanical Engineering Technology
 major in Construction Engineering Technology
 major in Electronics Engineering Technology
 major in Electrical Engineering Technology
 Bachelor of Science in Industrial Technology
 major in Automotive Technology
 major in Electrical Technology
 major in Electronics Technology
 major in Food Technology
 major in Computer Technology
School of Information and Communication Technology
 Bachelor of Science in Information Technology
 Bachelor of Science in Information System
 Bachelor of Science in Animation and Multimedia Arts 
 Bachelor of Science in Communication Technology 
School of Teacher Education
 Bachelor in Elementary Education
 major in General Education
 Bachelor in Secondary Education
 major in Mathematics
 major in Biology
School of Business Administration and Management
 Bachelor of Science in Hospitality Management 
 Bachelor of Science in Tourism Management 
School of Agriculture and Environmental Science
 Bachelor of Science Agriculture
 major in Animal Science
 major in Crop Science
 Bachelor of Science in Environmental Science 
School of Arts and Sciences
 Bachelor of Science in Biology
 Bachelor of Science in Mathematics
 Bachelor of Arts in English Language Studies
 Bachelor of Arts in Literature
 Bachelor of Arts in Political Science

References

State universities and colleges in the Philippines
Universities and colleges in Misamis Occidental